Inappropriate sinus tachycardia (IST) is a rare type of cardiac arrhythmia within the category of supraventricular tachycardia (SVT). IST may be caused by the sinus node itself having an abnormal structure or function, or it may be part of a problem called dysautonomia, a disturbance and/or failure of the autonomic nervous system. Research into the mechanism and etiology (cause) of inappropriate sinus tachycardia is ongoing.

IST is viewed by most to be a benign condition in the long-term. Symptoms of IST, however, may be distracting and warrant treatment. The heart is a strong muscle and typically can sustain the higher-than-normal heart rhythm, though monitoring the condition is generally recommended.
The mechanism and primary etiology of inappropriate sinus tachycardia has not been fully elucidated. An autoimmune mechanism has been suggested, as several studies have detected autoantibodies that activate beta adrenoreceptors in some patients. The mechanism of the arrhythmia primarily involves the sinus node and peri-nodal tissue and does not require the AV node for maintenance. Treatments in the form of pharmacological therapy or catheter ablation are available, but the condition is currently difficult to treat successfully.

Symptoms 

Symptoms reported by patients vary in frequency and severity. They may include:
 Frequent or sustained palpitations
 Chest pain 
 Dyspnea (shortness of breath) and palpitations on exertion
 Tachypnea (rapid breathing)
 Pre-syncope (feeling as if about to faint)
 Fatigue
 Dizziness
 Exercise intolerance
 Heacaches 
 Occasional paresthesia and cramping
 Symptoms associated with autonomic nervous system disturbance, including gastrointestinal disturbance

Diagnosis 

No formal diagnostic criteria exist. A diagnosis of inappropriate sinus tachycardia is primarily one of exclusion, and the following may be observed:
 Exclusion of all other causes of sinus tachycardia
 Common forms of supraventricular tachycardia (SVT) must be excluded
 Phaeochromocytoma must be excluded
 Normal P wave morphology
 A resting sinus tachycardia is usually (but not always) present
 Nocturnal dip in heart rate
 Inappropriate heart rate response on exertion
 Mean heart rate in 24hrs >95 bpm
 Symptoms are documented to be due to tachycardia
 Hypotension is occasionally observed
 Syncope (fainting) is occasionally reported

Treatment 

IST has been treated both pharmacologically and invasively, with varying degrees of success. IST, in and of itself, is not indicative of higher rates of mortality, and non-treatment is an option chosen by many if they have minimal symptoms.

Some types of medication tried by cardiologists and other physicians include: beta blockers, selective sinus node If channel inhibitors (such as ivabradine), calcium channel blockers, and antiarrhythmic agents. Some SSRI drugs are also occasionally tried, as are treatments more commonly used to treat postural orthostatic tachycardia syndrome, such as fludrocortisone.

Invasive treatments include forms of catheter ablation such as sinus node modification (selective ablation of the sinus node), complete sinus node ablation (with associated implantation of a permanent artificial pacemaker), and AV node ablation in very resistant cases (creation of iatrogenic complete heart block, necessitating implantation of a permanent artificial pacemaker). However, invasive treatments can also make the symptoms worse.

Differential diagnoses 
IST is primarily a diagnosis of exclusion. Upon exertion, an inappropriate heart rate response of sinus tachycardia can be seen in some Inborn Errors of Metabolism that result in metabolic myopathies, such as McArdle Disease (GSD-V). Rare diseases are more likely to be misdiagnosed, indeed, "Ninety percent of people with GSD V received a misdiagnosis before a corrected diagnosis (GSD VII unknown), resulting in a median diagnostic delay of 29 years, which can seriously affect QoL [Quality of Life]… Of those who are misdiagnosed, 62% report being misdiagnosed more than once."

See also 
 Supraventricular tachycardia
 Sinus tachycardia
 Postural orthostatic tachycardia syndrome
 Dysautonomia
 Metabolic myopathies

References

Further reading 
 
 
 
 
 
 

Cardiac arrhythmia